
Legio VII Gemina (Latin for "The Twins' Seventh Legion") was a legion of the Imperial Roman army. It was raised in AD 68 in Hispania by the general Galba to take part in his rebellion against the emperor Nero. "Gemina" means the legion was dedicated to the legendary twin founders of Rome, Romulus and Remus, who were suckled by a she-wolf. The legion was deployed in the city called Legio (modern-day León, Spain) in AD 74 and remained in Hispania to the end of the 4th century. 

Tacitus calls the legion "Galbiana", to distinguish it from the senior Legio VII Claudia, but this appellation is not found on any inscriptions. It appears to have received the appellation of "Gemina" on account of its amalgamation by Vespasian with one of the German legions, not improbably the Legio I Germanica. 

Between 86 and 89 the Legion was commanded by the future emperor and native of the region Trajan.

After serving in Pannonia and in the civil wars, it was settled by Vespasian in Hispania Tarraconensis, to supply the place of the Legio VI Victrix and Legio X Gemina, two of the three legions ordinarily stationed in the province, but which had been withdrawn to Germania.  The Antonine Itinerary, Ptolemy, the Notitia Imperii, as well as a few inscriptions all state that its regular winter quarters, under later emperors, were at Leon, but there are numerous inscriptions to prove that a strong detachment of it was stationed at Tarraco (modern Tarragona), the chief city of the province. The following are a selection, in order of time:
There is an inscription in which is found a "Tribunus Militum LEG. VII.

The legion had units stationed at their extended fortified camps:
Tarraco, modern day Tarragona, under the direct command of the governor of the Tarraconensis province.
Emerita Augusta, today Mérida, under the direct orders of the governor of the Lusitanian province.
Asturica Augusta, today Astorga, near the gold mines to supervise and escort its imperial trains.
Somewhere unknown in the north of Portugal near their gold mines.
Tritium Magallum  (Tricio in Rioja).
Lucus Augusti (Lugo).
Segisama (Sasamon Burgos) to control the main Roman Via of access to Aquitania.

Also under the legion were five auxiliary units, a cavalry wing, two cohorts of equitatae and two of peditatae:
II Wing, Flavia Hispanorum civium romanorum, cantoned in Petavonium (near Zamora).
Cohors I Celtiberorum Equitata civium romanorum, cantoned within Municipium Flaviae Brigantia (near A Coruña).
Cohors I Galica Equitata civium romanorum, cantoned at Pisoraca, (Herrera de Pisuerga, Palencia).
Cohors II Galica, cantoned in the unknown locality of "ad cohortem Galicam" (suspected to be in Portugal).
Cohors III Lucensium, cantoned near Lucus Augustium (Lugo).
 
During the majority of its existence, the number of effectives under the military commander of the VII were usually around the 7,712 between auxiliaries and regulars, not counting local levies and other reinforcements sent from Rome for temporary services.

The station of this legion in the Gallaecia Roman province grew into an important city, León, that after the invasions of 409 AD in Iberia became part of the Suevic Kingdom, which resisted the attacks of the Visigoths until 586, when it was taken by Leovigild. It was one of the few cities which the Visigoths allowed to retain their fortifications. 

The Roman bridge over the Tâmega River in Chaves, Portugal, then Aquae Flaviae, was built by the stationed legionnaires of the Legio VII Gemina at the time of Trajan.

Known members of the legion

See also
List of Roman legions

References

External links
livius.org account

07 Gemina
68 establishments
07 Gemina
Military units and formations established in the 1st century
60s establishments in the Roman Empire
60s establishments